Harmonia is the third major studio album by Japanese pop artist Akiko Shikata. It was released on March 18, 2009.

Track listing
 
 
 
 
 
 
 
 
 
 
 
 
 
 
 Amnesia

References

2009 albums
Avex Group albums